Penang Reserves is a reserve team of Penang FC which consists 2 teams, Penang FC President's Cup Team (U21) and Penang FC Youth's Cup Team (U19).

Penang FC President's Cup Team are the under-21 team of Penang FC. They play in the Malaysia President's Cup, which is the top level of reserve football in Malaysia. They were the Champions in the 2004 season. The team mainly consists of Under-21 players at the club, although senior players occasionally have an appearance. The President's Cup Team is coached by Rahim Hassan.

Penang FC Youth Cup Team are the under-19 team of Penang FC. It is a member of the Malaysia Youth League. The Youth Cup Team  is coached by Zabidi Hassan.

The youth setup has produced some Malaysia internationals, such as Salahuddin Che Rose, Moey Kok Hong, Kamarulzaman Hassan, Megat Amir Faisal, Hasmawi Hassan, Abdul Aziz Ismail, S. Veenod, S. Kumaahran, Syamer Kutty Abba, and Faisal Halim.

From 2022 season, the under-21 team play their home games at USM Athletics Stadium. The under-19 team play their home games at the Penang State Stadium.

Honours

Current squad

President's Cup squad (U21)

OA Over-age player

Youth's Cup Squad (U19)

Coaching and technical staff

Head coaches history
Penang FC President's Cup Team (U21)

Penang FC Youth Cup Team (U19)

Kit shirts

See also
 Penang F.C.

References

Youth and Academy
Malaysian reserve football teams
Football academies in Malaysia